The International Solar-Terrestrial Physics Science Initiative (or ISTP for short) is an international research collaboration between NASA, the ESA, and ISAS.  Its goal is to study physical phenomena related to the Sun, solar wind and its effects on Earth.

See also
List of heliophysics missions

References

External links
NASA's ISTP web site

Sun